Brionne Davis (born Dallas, Texas, 1976) is an American actor, director and producer of theater, film and TV. Davis grew up in Paris, Texas and has developed his career in theater, TV and indie films in Austin, New York City and currently in Los Angeles.

Davis is best known for his leading role in the Academy Award nominee Embrace of the Serpent (2015), in which he plays a character based on the American ethnobotanist Richard Evans Schultes.

Filmography

Film

Television

References 

1976 births
Living people
American male actors